Anna Prysazhnuka (born 21 May 1990) is a Latvian amateur snooker and pool player. She was runner-up at the 2017 Women's EBSA European Snooker Championship, winning the first frame of the final against Wendy Jans before losing the match 1–5.

At the 2019 European Snooker Championship, Anastasia Nechaeva beat Prysazhnuka 4–2 in the semi-final.

Prysazhnuka and Tatjana Vasiljeva were runners-up in the 2016 Ladies European Team Snooker Championship, losing 1–4 to the Russia 1 team of Anastasia Nechaeva and Daria Sirotina in the final.

Notable Results

European Championship Snooker (Women)

European Championship Pool
Source: Kozoom

2015 Ten-ball European Championship (Women) - ranked 33rd
2018 Straight pool European Championship (Women) - ranked 17th
2018 Ten-ball European Championship (Women) - ranked 17th
2018 Straight pool European Championship (Women) - ranked 17th

References

External links
 Anna Prysazhnuka vs Anastasia Nechaeva, 2016 (YouTube)

1990 births
Living people
Latvian snooker players
Female pool players
Female snooker players